Phil Dyer (born July 6, 1951) is an American politician and banker who was 38th mayor of Plano, Texas.  He was first elected in 2009.

He has a Bachelor of Arts degree from the University of Texas at Austin in 1973. He received his Masters of Business Administration from East Texas State University in 1981. Dyer served on several local boards and committees starting in 1984 and was in the Plano City Council from 1999 through 2005. He is also the president of LegacyTexas Bank.

Dyer was voted Plano Citizen of the Year in 1998 by the Plano Chamber of Commerce.

References

External links
City of Plano biography

Mayors of Plano, Texas
Texas city council members
University of Texas at Austin alumni
Texas A&M University–Commerce alumni
1951 births
Living people